Jean Claes (7 August 1934 – 5 January 2004) was a Belgian footballer. He played in one match for the Belgium national football team in 1959.

References

External links
 

1934 births
2004 deaths
Belgian footballers
Belgium international footballers
Place of birth missing
Association football defenders
K.V.K. Tienen-Hageland players
Royale Union Saint-Gilloise players
Sint-Truidense V.V. players